Nicolás Redondo Urbieta (16 June 1927 – 3 January 2023) was a Spanish trade unionist and politician. A member of the Spanish Socialist Workers' Party, he served as secretary-general of the Unión General de Trabajadores from 1976 to 1994 and was a deputy from 1977 to 1987.

Redondo died in Madrid on 3 January 2023, at the age of 95.

References

1927 births
2023 deaths
Members of the constituent Congress of Deputies (Spain)
Members of the 1st Congress of Deputies (Spain)
Members of the 2nd Congress of Deputies (Spain)
Members of the 3rd Congress of Deputies (Spain)
Spanish Socialist Workers' Party politicians
Unión General de Trabajadores members
Spanish trade union leaders
People from Barakaldo